Daniel Beery (born January 4, 1975) is an American competition rower, Olympic champion, world champion and world cup gold medalist.

Beery won a gold medal in Men's Eights at the 2004 Summer Olympics, as a member of the American team. The time 5:19.85 was a new world record. Beery is a member of the New York Athletic Club's Hall of Fame.  He retired from rowing in 2008.  Prior to his start in rowing at the University of Tennessee Chattanooga, Beery played collegiate basketball.

After proposing via text message, he married American Olympic rower Jennifer Goldsack on January 17, 2009 - they first met at the US Rowing Training Center in Princeton, but they first became properly acquainted at the 2007 world championships in Munich. Dan is now remarried to Sabrina Iffland and they have 2 children together.

He now works as a sports insurance broker in Philadelphia, Pennsylvania.

Beery is also now an assistant coach for the Upper Merion Area High School rowing team. He works alongside head coach Franck Kiser and former national team member Frederick Winstead.

References

External links
 
 
 

1975 births
Living people
American male rowers
Olympic gold medalists for the United States in rowing
Rowers at the 2004 Summer Olympics
Medalists at the 2004 Summer Olympics
Pan American Games medalists in rowing
Pan American Games gold medalists for the United States
Pan American Games silver medalists for the United States
Rowers at the 2007 Pan American Games
Medalists at the 2007 Pan American Games
World Rowing Championships medalists for the United States